Stanley James Smith (24 February 1931 – 8 April 2010) was an English footballer. A forward, he scored 25 goals in 92 league games in an eight-year career in the English Football League. He spent 1950 to 1957 with Port Vale, and later had brief spells with Crewe Alexandra, Oldham Athletic, Witton Albion, Macclesfield Town, Stafford Rangers, Runcorn, New Brighton and managed Winsford United and Alsager Town.

Career
Smith played for Stoke City before joining rivals Port Vale in May 1950. It took until 27 September 1954 for manager Freddie Steele to hand him his debut, in a 1–0 defeat at Doncaster Rovers. He scored his first goal at Vale Park in a 3–3 draw with Ipswich Town on 23 October, and went on to score eight goals in 26 games in 1954–55, including two against West Ham United in the FA Cup. Smith scored five goals in 20 Second Division games in 1955–56, including a brace against Bristol City on 30 March.

He scored twice past Sheffield United in a 4–2 defeat at Bramall Lane on 25 August 1956, and seven days later scored another brace against Bristol City. A week later he scored another two goals, in a 4–2 win over Blackburn Rovers at Ewood Park. He also scored against Potteries derby rivals Stoke City in a 3–1 defeat at the Victoria Ground on 10 October. However he lost his first team place in November 1956, and finished the 1956–57 season with eight goals in 17 appearances. New manager Norman Low sold him on to Crewe Alexandra in July 1957, who finished bottom of the Third Division North under Maurice Lindley's stewardship in 1957–58. He then played four league games for Oldham Athletic after being signed for a £250 fee, but left Boundary Park after telling the club he did not want to be a full-time professional as he was employed as a planning engineer for English Electric. He moved on to Cheshire County League club Witton Albion later in 1958, and scored 32 goals from 45 games in the 1958–59 season. He scored 26 goals in 40 games during the 1959–60 campaign. He scored two goals in seven games at the start of the 1960–61 season, before he signed with Macclesfield Town in 1960. He scored a brace on his debut against Stafford Rangers at Moss Rose, and went on to score seven hat-tricks and 38 league goals to become the club's top-scorer in the 1960–61 season. He scored 26 goals in 41 league games in the 1961–62 campaign and 22 goals in 37 league matches in the 1962–63 season, finishing as the club's top-scorer on both occasions. He went on to play for Stafford Rangers, Runcorn and New Brighton.

Post-retirement
Upon his retirement as a player, Smith became manager of non-league club Winsford United. After his career in the game finished, Smith remained a keen Port Vale fan and later became the chairman of the Executive Club. He worked at ROF Radway Green, English Electric in Kidsgrove, and ICL at Winsford. He later ran his own firm in Chesterton, Staffordshire. He married Brenda in 1951.

Career statistics

References

1931 births
2010 deaths
People from Kidsgrove
English footballers
Association football forwards
Stoke City F.C. players
Port Vale F.C. players
Crewe Alexandra F.C. players
Oldham Athletic A.F.C. players
Witton Albion F.C. players
Macclesfield Town F.C. players
Stafford Rangers F.C. players
Runcorn F.C. Halton players
New Brighton A.F.C. players
English Football League players
English football managers
Stafford Rangers F.C. managers